Ulmus castaneifolia Hemsley, the chestnut-leafed elm or multinerved elm, is a small deciduous tree found across much of China in broadleaved forests at elevations of .

Description
The bark is thick with a pronounced corky layer, and is longitudinally fissured. The branchlets are devoid of the corky wings common to many elms. The leaves are generally narrow, ranging from obovate to elliptic, up to 15 cm long, and densely hirsute when young. The perfect wind-pollinated apetalous flowers are produced on second-year shoots in February; the samarae are mostly obovate < 30 × 16 mm.

Pests and diseases
Ulmus castaneifolia is resistant to Dutch elm disease and to elm leaf beetle Xanthogaleruca luteola.

Cultivation
The species is very rare in cultivation; it was one of 12 Chinese species under evaluation at the Morton Arboretum, Illinois, in 2009 by the late Dr George Ware. In artificial freezing tests at the arboretum, the LT50 (temperature at which 50% of tissues die) was found to be −26 °C. There are no known cultivars of this taxon, nor is it known to be in commerce.

Notable trees
The UK TROBI champion grows at Calderstones Park, Merseyside. Another of similar dimensions grows at the Royal Botanic Gardens Kew, planted in 1973.

Accessions
North America
 Chicago Botanic Garden, US. Planted in West Collections Area.
 Denver Botanic Gardens, US. Acc. details not available
 Morton Arboretum, US. Acc. no. 46–95. obtained from Yunnan Province, China.
 University of British Columbia Botanical Garden, Vancouver, British Columbia, Canada. Acc. no. 027099–0437–1989, (as U. multinervis).
 United States National Arboretum, Washington, D.C., US. Acc. nos. 76219, 68914.  
Europe
 Calderstones Park, Merseyside, UK. TROBI Champion, 13 m high, 45 cm d.b.h. (2011).
 Grange Farm Arboretum, Lincolnshire, UK. Acc. no. 698.
 Hortus Botanicus Nationalis, Salaspils, Latvia. Acc. no. 18149 (as U. multinervis W. C. Cheng), from Beijing.
 Royal Botanic Gardens, Kew, UK. Acc. no. 1973–11726
 Sir Harold Hillier Gardens, UK. Acc. no. 1994.0327, area PC 700, origin not disclosed.
 Strona Arboretum, University of Life Sciences, Warsaw, Poland, (as Ulmus multinervis).
Wijdemeren City Council, Netherlands. Elm Arboretum, 2 planted Overmeerseweg, Nederhorst den Berg in 2015.

References

External links

  Samara specimen; sheet labelled Ulmus castaneifolia, Hort. Bot. Parisiensis 

castaneifolia
Trees of China
Flora of China
Trees of Asia
Ulmus articles with images
Elm species and varieties